Pak Yong-sik (born 1950) is a senior North Korean military officer and Workers' Party of Korea (WPK) politician, who served as the country's defence minister from 2015 to 2018. Pak is the 6th Defense Minister appointed by Kim Jong-un. Pak is a member of the Central Military Commission of the Workers' Party of Korea.

Pak Yong-sik was appointed vice-director of the Political Department of the Korean People's Army sometime before January 2015, having previously served as an official of the Ministry of People's Security. He was promoted to general in April 2015, and shortly thereafter he took over the post of minister of the People's Armed Forces after his predecessor, Hyon Yong-chol, was demoted for insubordination. His promotion was publicly revealed on 11 July, though the exact date of his appointment is unknown.

In June 2018, it was announced that he had been sacked about a week before the summit between North Korea and the United States, and was replaced in the position by No Kwang-chol, the first vice minister of the Ministry of People's armed forces.

Summary of service

Assignment history 
 April 1999: Major general
 April 14, 2009: Lieutenant general
 April 2014: Colonel general
 2015: Army general

References

North Korean generals
Government ministers of North Korea
People from Pyongyang
Living people
Defence ministers of North Korea
1950 births
North Korean individuals subject to the U.S. Department of the Treasury sanctions